The Official Work is a mixtape by Atlanta-based rap duo Ying Yang Twins, released on August 26, 2008.

Track listing
 "Rollin'" - 3:42
 "Ying Yanguage (Skit)" - 0:57
 "Don't Trip" - 4:06
 "Swag" - 3:15
 "What Ying Yang Mean (Skit)" - 0:27
 "Ochee" (Produced by Spadez) - 3:50
 "Go" - 3:31
 "3, 6, 9" - 0:09
 "Juaah" - 4:11
 "Look Back at It" - 4:20
 "How Dat Shit Came Upon (Skit)" - 0:15
 "Whoop Ass" - 3:22
 "Outside Da Box (Skit)" - 0:37
 "Cheech & Chong" - 3:50
 "Ying Meets the Yang (Skit)" - 0:23
 "Wind" - 4:59
 "Music from the Soul (Skit)" - 0:11

References

2008 mixtape albums
Ying Yang Twins albums